The Xi'an Metro is a rapid transit system serving the city of Xi'an, the capital of Shaanxi province, with stations in seven of the city's eleven districts and 2 counties and the neighbouring city of Xianyang. It is the first city to operate a subway in Northwest China and the tenth city in mainland China to operate a subway. Xi'an began planning urban rapid rail transit in the 1980s and was approved for construction by the state on September 13, 2006. The first line, line 2, opened September 16, 2011 followed by line 1 on September 15, 2013 and line 3 on November 8, 2016. Line 4 opened on December 26, 2018. Airport Intercity Railway opened on September 29, 2019.

The system consists of five lines spanning  with 100 stations. The system carried a total of 746.2 million riders in 2018.

Lines

Xi'an Metro has five lines in operation. Line 2 opened to the public on September 16, 2011. Line 1 began operation on September 15, 2013. Line 3 started after months of delay on November 8, 2016. Line 4 opened on December 26, 2018. Airport Intercity Railway opened on September 29, 2019.

Xi'an began its metro system plan in the mid-1980s. In February 2004, the re-drafted plan was submitted to the State Government, which received final approval on September 13, 2006.

The first line, Line 2, began construction along Chang'an Street on 29 September 2006 and was completed in 2011. It runs north-south and passes under such historic sites as the Bell Tower and city wall. It is estimated to have cost 17.9 billion yuan (US$2.24 billion). The route stretches from the Beikezhan to Weiqunan with 20 stops. The travel time is 39 minutes for the entire length, cutting the commute almost in half. Operations began on 28 September 2011.

Four other routes were planned to start construction in 2011 and to be finished by around 2020. When completed, the system will span  and will mainly service the urban and suburban districts of Xi'an and part of Xianyang.

Stations
 Legend

References

Xian
Lists of railway stations in China
Xi'an Metro stations